Notes from a Ceiling is the second album from the Australian two-piece rock band The Mess Hall, which was issued on 20 June 2005. It peaked at No. 8 on the ARIA Hitseekers Albums Chart.
It won an ARIA Music Award for Engineer of the Year for Matt Lovell, and a nomination for Producer of the Year for Chris Joannou and the group. It was short-listed for the inaugural Australian Music Prize and was included in both Triple J and Rolling Stone's Top 50 of 2005.

According to Jed Kurzel (vocalist/guitarist), the only recollection he has of recording the album is that Cec Condon (drummer/vocals) nearly set fire to the studio whilst barbecuing, and that while suffering vertigo, the attending doctor was more interested in whether the band were touring on the next Big Day Out than attending to his illness.
In early 2004, Kurzel lived somewhat of a nomadic lifestyle. Having moved house once, he kept moving from friend's place to friend's place. His main memory of that year is "staring up at different ceilings, wondering what the hell I was doing"  which is how the album title came about.

Track listing
 "Diddley" – 5:23
 "Pills" – 4:00
 "Call It Black" – 4:12
 "Disco 1" – 3:59
 "Skyline" – 6:01
 "Shaky Ground" – 3:28
 "Metal And Hair" – 2:35
 "Disco 2" – 4:38
 "Holes" – 2:41
 "Red Eyes And Sunshine" – 6:34

References

External links
 The Mess Hall

2005 albums
ARIA Award-winning albums
The Mess Hall albums
Shock Records albums
Albums produced by Matt Lovell